Julia Riera (born 29 May 2002) is an Argentine tennis player.

Riera has a career-high singles ranking by the Women's Tennis Association (WTA) of 257, achieved on 28 November 2022. She also has a career-high doubles ranking by the WTA of 374, achieved on 6 March 2023. She has won three singles titles on the ITF Circuit.

Riera competes for Argentina in the Billie Jean King Cup, where she has a win/loss record of 1–1.

ITF Circuit finals

Singles: 5 (3 titles, 2 runner-ups)

Doubles: 2 (2 runner-ups)

References

External links
 
 
 

2002 births
Living people
Argentine female tennis players
21st-century Argentine women